The year 2002 is the tenth year in the history of Pancrase, a mixed martial arts promotion based in Japan. In 2002 Pancrase held 12 events beginning with Pancrase: Spirit 1.

Title fights

Events list

Pancrase: Spirit 1

Pancrase: Spirit 1 was an event held on January 27, 2002 at Korakuen Hall in Tokyo, Japan.

Results

Pancrase: Spirit 2

Pancrase: Spirit 2 was an event held on February 17, 2002 at Umeda Stella Hall in Osaka, Osaka, Japan.

Results

Pancrase: Spirit 3

Pancrase: Spirit 3 was an event held on March 25, 2002 at Korakuen Hall in Tokyo, Japan.

Results

Pancrase: Spirit 4

Pancrase: Spirit 4 was an event held on May 11, 2002 at Umeda Stella Hall in Osaka, Osaka, Japan.

Results

Pancrase: Spirit 5

Pancrase: Spirit 5 was an event held on May 28, 2002 at Korakuen Hall in Tokyo, Japan.

Results

Pancrase: 2002 Neo-Blood Tournament Opening Round

Pancrase: 2002 Neo-Blood Tournament Opening Round was an event held on July 28, 2002 at Korakuen Hall in Tokyo, Japan.

Results

Pancrase: 2002 Neo-Blood Tournament Second Round

Pancrase: 2002 Neo-Blood Tournament Second Round was an event held on July 28, 2002 at Korakuen Hall in Tokyo, Japan.

Results

Pancrase: Spirit 6

Pancrase: Spirit 6 was an event held on August 25, 2002 at Umeda Stella Hall in Osaka, Osaka, Japan.

Results

Pancrase: 2002 Anniversary Show

Pancrase: 2002 Anniversary Show was an event held on September 29, 2002 at the Yokohama Cultural Gymnasium in Yokohama, Kanagawa, Japan.

Results

Pancrase: Spirit 7

Pancrase: Spirit 7 was an event held on October 29, 2002 at Korakuen Hall in Tokyo, Japan.

Results

Pancrase: Spirit 8

Pancrase: Spirit 8 was an event held on November 30, 2002 at the Yokohama Cultural Gymnasium in Yokohama, Kanagawa, Japan.

Results

Pancrase: Spirit 9

Pancrase: Spirit 9 was an event held on December 21, 2002 at Korakuen Hall in Tokyo, Japan.

Results

See also 
 Pancrase
 List of Pancrase champions
 List of Pancrase events

References

Pancrase events
2002 in mixed martial arts